In astrophysics, the Bonnor–Ebert mass is the largest mass that an isothermal gas sphere embedded in a pressurized medium can have while still remaining in hydrostatic equilibrium. Clouds of gas with masses greater than the Bonnor–Ebert mass must inevitably undergo gravitational collapse to form much smaller and denser objects. As the gravitational collapse of an interstellar gas cloud is the first stage in the formation of a protostar, the Bonnor–Ebert mass is an important quantity in the study of star formation.

For a gas cloud embedded in a medium with a gas pressure , the Bonnor–Ebert mass is given by

For a uniform mass density  and for a centrally peaked density .

See also
 Jeans mass

References

Interstellar media
Equations of astronomy